General Casey may refer to:

Aloysius G. Casey (1932–2020), U.S. Air Force lieutenant general
George W. Casey Sr. (1922-1970), U.S. Army major general during Vietnam War
George W. Casey Jr. (born 1948), U.S. Army Chief of Staff during Obama administration
Hugh John Casey (1898-1981), U.S. Army major general during World War II
Levi Casey (politician) (1752-1807), South Carolina militia brigadier general after the Revolutionary War
Silas Casey (1807–1882), Union Army major general

See also
 Casey's General Stores
 Casey (surname)
 Casey (given name)
 Casey (disambiguation)